Gheorghe Dogărescu (15 May 1960 − 18 August 2020) was a Romanian handball player who won a bronze medal at the 1984 Olympics. He spent most of his club career with Dinamo București, reaching with them the final of the 1981 EHF Cup Winners' Cup.

References

1960 births
2020 deaths
People from Brăila County
CS Dinamo București (men's handball) players
Handball players at the 1984 Summer Olympics
Olympic handball players of Romania
Romanian male handball players
Olympic bronze medalists for Romania
Olympic medalists in handball
S.L. Benfica handball players
Medalists at the 1984 Summer Olympics
20th-century Romanian people